Sacred Warpath is an EP by German thrash metal band Sodom, released in 2014. It contains one original studio track and live versions of three previously released songs. "Sacred Warpath" was re-recorded two years later on the band's fifth studio album, Decision Day (2016).

Production and release
Sacred Warpath was released in CD and digital formats on 28 November 2014 in Germany, 1 December in Europe, and 20 January 2015 in North America. However, due to a small error, the release of a 10" vinyl version was delayed until 19 December in Germany and 22 December in Europe.

Track listing

Credits
Tom Angelripper - vocals, bass
Bernd "Bernemann" Kost - lead and rhythm guitar
Markus "Makka" Freiwald - drums
Cornelius Rambadt - production

References

2014 EPs
Sodom (band) EPs